The women's 50 metre freestyle S9 event at the 2012 Paralympic Games took place on 5 September, at the London Aquatics Centre.

Two heats were held, each of them with six competitors. The swimmers with the eight fastest times advanced to the final.

Heats

Final

References

Swimming at the 2012 Summer Paralympics
2012 in women's swimming